Os og Fusaposten is a local newspaper published in Os, Hordaland, Norway. It was established in 1987.

In 2007 it had a circulation of 5793, of whom 4981 are subscribers.

Os og Fusaposten was given the Local Newspaper of the Year award in Norway in 2005. The award is presented by the National Association of Local Newspapers.

References

External links
Official website

Newspapers established in 1987
Newspapers published in Norway
Mass media in Hordaland
Os, Hordaland
Norwegian-language newspapers